The Meadows, also known as The Blake House, is a historic home located near Fletcher, Henderson County, North Carolina. It was built about 1860, and is a two-story, granite rubble stone dwelling in the Italianate style.  It has a low hipped roof pierced with three interior chimneys and a two-story rear extension.  The front facade features a one-bay porch flanked by semi-hexagonal bays.

It was listed on the National Register of Historic Places in 1980.

References

External links

Houses on the National Register of Historic Places in North Carolina
Italianate architecture in North Carolina
Houses completed in 1860
Houses in Henderson County, North Carolina
National Register of Historic Places in Henderson County, North Carolina